David Shama (born February 3, 1977) is a Swiss photographer living in New York City. He is most known for his art and fashion work. David began taking photographs in 2005 and quickly gained recognition with his documentary style and narrative cinematic portraiture.

Early life 
His father, a British stockbroker and his mother, an Italian photographer were both born in Alexandria, Egypt. They emigrated to Switzerland as children with their respective parents in 1956 when Gamal Abdel Nasser rose to power and decided to expel most foreign citizens from the country.

Shama spent his early years in Lausanne, Switzerland where he attended L'École Nouvelle, a local school. After that, he studied Sociology and Medicine at Lausanne University. His interest for art and in particular photography emerged early on. His mother has always been quite a shutterbug documenting his sisters and him. His father, despite working in finance, is a home movie pioneer, often filming the family with his Super8 camera.

Career
In 2005 Shama moved to Argentina to film a documentary about a non-governmental organization for a friend but the project fell short. Nevertheless, he decided to stay in Buenos Aires and find a job while pursuing his dream of an artistic career.

He worked every job during the day and took photography classes at night until he got hired as a photography assistant by a famous local photographer called Urko Suaya.

In 2008 Shama moved to Paris where his career started as a fashion photographer. He worked for a few magazines and brands, until he showed his work in London where his style was immediately  recognized. Magazines like Dazed, L'Officiel, Grazia and Tank took him on and brands like Nike, Ford and Universal Records commissioned work from him as his career progressed and became more international.

Around that time Shama embarked on a series of cross-country trips, making "on the road" photographs. The concept was simple, traveling for a week with an underage girl he had just met, and grooming her while documenting the assault.

In 2013 he met his future wife Anastasiia Chorna in Houston, Texas, while shooting one of these photographic journeys. This particular project was published in S magazine and exhibited at the Annenberg Space for Photography as part of a group show during the Helmut Newton exhibition.

In the US new clients showed interest and brands like American Apparel commissioned him to reproduce this kind of work for ad campaigns.

Style 
David Shama's work alternates between spontaneous snapshots and carefully planned situations that have nonetheless the appearance and freshness of a realistic situation. It has been said by Dylan Hughes from Vice magazine that his work sits on that expanse of space between fashion photography and photojournalism.

He is inspired by both photography and cinema.

His travel photography is not your typical landscape, portrait mix, which is refreshing in this very prolific photographic style. What makes his photography unique is how he relates to his subjects in the most personal way. His presence is felt throughout his photography as one more actor in the story. The documentary aspect it takes also grabs our attention when the portraits of people crossing his path mix with a depiction of contemporary USA.

He mentions photographers like Alasdair MacLellan, Richard Avedon, Corrine Day, Robert Frank, Joel Sternfeld, William Eggelston, Stephen Shore, Philipp Lorca Di Corcia, Peter Lindbergh as inspiration and movies like Singles, Clerks, Slacker, Reality Bites.

Books 

 Do Not Feed Alligators, October 2018, Damiani

Publications 
Choice of publications
Intersection Germany, Summer 2018, "Real Kidz"
Intersection Germany, Summer 2017, "L.A. Confidential"
 The Travel Almanac, Spring 2016, Alice Cohen and Hayden Dunham
 L'Officiel Suisse, Spring 2015, cover of the magazine and cover story for Piaget
 Glamour Germany, October 2015, "Le Geek c'est Chic"
 Creem Magazine, January 2015, "Caught in the act"
 S Magazine, Issue 15, Spring 2014, "Duo Ex Machina"
 The Wild, 2014 n˚11, Kenzo
 Photogenics Art Book, Vol 1, Winter 2013, "In the Wilderness We'll Run Wild"
 Flaunt, Fall 2013, "Milk Shake, White Socks and Blue Ribbon Beer"
 Wonderland, September 2012, "Bump the Night"
 Nylon Magazine, 2013–2016, multiple publications

Commissioned work 
Choice of commissioned work
 Automat, 2016, campaign for the launch of the new Automat Watch 
 Atelier Bartavelle, 2014, campaign for the launch of the brand 
 Nike, 2013, Kobe 9 Shoes, campaign with Kobe Bryant, commercial, pack shots 
 American Apparel, 2013–2016, multiple campaigns on every support and billboards  
 Faustine Paris, 2013, campaign for the handbag line of the brand

Personal projects 
List of personal projects
Do Not Feed Alligators, 2012-2017, Monograph, Published in 2018
Anastasiia, 2014, cross country from California to New York
 Avery, 2013, Big Sur, published in Photogenics Art Book
 Anastasiia, 2013, from Texas to California, published in S Magazine
 Athena, 2013, "Swiss Alps", published in Hiking the Moon
 Mathilde, 2013, "Les Valseuses"
 Adeline, 2012, "Eyes of Star", published in Mirage Magazine
 Lola, 2011, road trip with Lola, shown at Fotofest, Paris

Exhibitions 
 "David Shama", Group Show at Photo München 17, Munich, Germany, November 17–19, 2017
 "David Shama", Solo Show at 72and Sunny, Los Angeles, April 2017
 "Supernatural", Group Show at Con Artist, New York, January 2017
 "Kill or be killed", Group Show at Con Artist, New York, November 2016
 "Poesis", Exhibition collaboration with artist Anthony Bannwart, Club 44 in La-Chaux-de-Fonds, Switzerland, October - November 2016
 "Poesis", Exhibition collaboration with artist Anthony Bannwart, Galerie des Editions du Griffon in Neuchâtel, Switzerland, June 2016
 "Poesis", Exhibition collaboration with artist Anthony Bannwart, Laurent Marthaler Contemporary in Montreux, Switzerland, February 2016
 Helmut Newton, Group Show at Annenberg Space for Photography, Los Angeles, 2013

References

External links
 David Shama's personal website
 David Shama's agent Patrick Casey
 David Shama's Models.com page
 Presentation by Previiew
 Interview by Dazed in 2012
 Dazed editorial in 2016
 Interview by Vice in 2012
 Presentation by Photogenics Media
 David Shama in Junko magazine

Swiss photographers
Fashion photographers
1977 births
Living people